GFG may refer to:

Companies and organizations
 Global Fashion Group
 GFG Alliance
 Games for Good
 Grupo Financiero Galicia
 Joint Financial Investigative Unit of Federal Criminal Police Office (Germany)
 GFG Style Studio, car design studio of Giorgetto Giugiaro

Other uses
 GFG, ICAO code for Georgian National Airlines
 Greedy-Face-Greedy, a Geographic routing strategy
 Grown Folks Gospel, album by J. Moss